Alexander Irvine may refer to:

 Alexander C. Irvine, American fantasist and science fiction writer
 Derry Irvine, Baron Irvine of Lairg, British lawyer and political figure
 Alexander Irvine (knight), 15th century Laird of Drum Castle and Chief of Clan Irvine
 Alexander Irvine (MP), British Member of Parliament for East Looe
 Alexander Forbes Irvine of Drum FRSE
 Alexander Irwin, also spelled Irvine, British Army general